Fiona Forbes is a Canadian television personality who hosted the entertainment talk show Urban Rush on Shaw Cable and worked on CityTvs Breakfast Television. She currently hosts The Rush, in Vancouver. In 2002 she was the winner of a Leo Award, with her co-host Michael Eckford, for best variety show hosts.

Forbes has performed charity work for the Vancouver Library. She has a degree in history from the University of British Columbia.

References

External links
Fiona Forbes' official website

Canadian television talk show hosts
University of British Columbia alumni
Year of birth missing (living people)
Living people
People from Vancouver